This is a list of yearly Southern Intercollegiate Athletic Association football standings.

SIAA standings

References

Southern Intercollegiate Athletic Association
Standings